Pandi Gëllçi is a notable Albanian volleyball coach of the women team of  Skenderbeu. His team was the only rival of Dinamo Tirana team in the 1980s, when Dinamo often reached the European final four of the Women's CEV Champions League.

References

Year of birth missing (living people)
Albanian sports coaches
20th-century Albanian sports coaches
21st-century Albanian sports coaches
Living people
Volleyball in Albania
Volleyball coaches